This is a complete list of the fellows and foreign members of the Royal Society elected in 1913.

Fellows 

Vernon Herbert Blackman
William Bulloch
David Leonard Chapman
William Ernest Dalby
Thomas Renton Elliott
John Charles Fields
Sir John Smith Flett
James Peter Hill
Arthur Robert Hinks
Sir Frederick William Keeble
Sir Arthur Keith
Keith Lucas
Sir Owen Willans Richardson
Walter Rosenhain
George Walker Walker

Froegin members

Charles Eugene Barrois
Henry Louis Le Chatelier
Pierre Paul Emile Roux
Simon Schwendener
Woldemar Voigt

1913
1913 in the United Kingdom
1913 in science